Attenuated familial adenomatous polyposis is a form of familial adenomatous polyposis, a cancer syndrome. It is a pre-malignant disease that can develop into colorectal cancer. A patient will have fewer than a hundred polyps located typically in right side of the colon.  Cancer might develop as early as the age of five, though typically presents later than classical FAP.

See also
 Familial adenomatous polyposis
 Birt–Hogg–Dubé syndrome
 Cowden syndrome
 Cronkhite–Canada syndrome
 Juvenile polyposis
 MUTYH
 Peutz–Jeghers syndrome

References

External links 

Gastrointestinal cancer
Hereditary cancers